Fox Classics (formerly known as Fox Crime) was a Japanese pay television channel owned by Fox Networks Group Asia Pacific. Its programming consisted of the American dramas from the 1980s to the 1990s.

The channel was renamed as Fox Classics on 1 August 2015.

The channel ceased broadcasting as of 30 September 2018.

References

Television channels and stations established in 2006
Television channels and stations disestablished in 2018
Asia Pacific